Joseph Anton Glantschnigg (1695–1750) was a German painter of historical, genre, and landscape scenes, born and deceased in Bolzano, but active in Würzburg. He was the son of painter Ulrich Glantschnigg.

References 
 CERL Thesaurus entry
 Bryan's dictionary of painters and engravers, Volume 2, Michael Bryan, George Charles Williamson, G. Bell and sons, 1903, page 252.
 Neues allgemeines Künstler-Lexicon, oder, Nachrichten von dem Leben und den Werken der Maler, Bildhauer, Baumeister, Kupferstecher, Formschneider, Lithographen, Zeichner, Medailleure, Elfenbeinarbeiter, etc, Volume 5, Georg Kaspar Nagler, Schwarzenberg & Schumann, pages 514–515.

1695 births
1750 deaths
18th-century German painters
18th-century German male artists
Landscape painters